Andrea Kiewel (née  Mathyssek, born 10 June 1965 in East Berlin) is a German television presenter and former competitive swimmer. She is the current presenter of ZDF Fernsehgarten and ZDF Fernsehgarten on Tour. Andrea usually presents 'Willkommen', the ZDF new year open-air show live from Berlin Her son Maximilian Kiewel (born 1986) is a journalist who worked as chief reporter for Bild and television presenter of the BILD TV for the television show "Achtung Fahndung!".

References

External links
 ZDF-Fernsehgarten

German television presenters
German women television presenters
Living people
1965 births
ZDF people
Sat.1 people
People from East Berlin
People from Berlin
20th-century German women